Singel 39 is a 2019 Dutch romantic comedy film directed by Frank Krom. The film won the Golden Film award after having sold 100,000 tickets. The film ranks in sixth place in the top 10 of best visited Dutch films of 2019.

The title song of the film was made by Dutch singer-songwriter Douwe Bob. He also makes an appearance in the film as a waiter.

Plot 

Cardiac surgeon Monqiue (Lies Visschedijk) has centered her life around her work. When extraverted gay artist Max (Waldemar Torenstra) moves in next door they develop a friendship which makes her realise there is more to life than work.

Cast 

 Lies Visschedijk as Monqiue
 Waldemar Torenstra as Max
 Eva van de Wijdeven as Sam
 Dahiana Candelo as Co-assistant
 Gerard Cox as Vader
 Steyn de Leeuwe as Diederik
 Fabrice Deville as J.J.
 Loes Haverkort as Marleen
 Douwe Bob as coffee shop worker

References

External links 
 

2019 films
2010s Dutch-language films
Dutch romantic comedy films
Films directed by Frank Krom
2019 romantic comedy films